Tricia Gardiner (born 16 August 1935) is a British equestrian. She competed in two events at the 1988 Summer Olympics.

References

External links
 

1935 births
Living people
British female equestrians
British dressage riders
Olympic equestrians of Great Britain
Equestrians at the 1988 Summer Olympics
Sportspeople from London